Southern Park is a public park in Tampere, Finland. It was designed by the engineer K. Vaaramäki and built by landscape gardener Onni Karsten.  It is a common venue for musical concerts during the summer.

References

External links

Parks in Tampere